L9 may refer to:


Military
 HMS L9, a British L class submarine 
 L9 Bar Mine, a large rectangular British anti-tank landmine 
 L9A1 51 mm light mortar, used by the British Army
 Royal Ordnance L9, a British tank gun
 USS L-9 (SS-49), an L-class submarine of the United States Navy

Science and technology
 60S ribosomal protein L9, a protein that is encoded by the human RPL9 gene
 Level 9 Computing, a text-based game company
 LG Optimus L9, a mobile smartphone
 LG L9, a system on a chip for Smart TV devices
 Motorola SLVR L9, a mobile phone

Other uses
 Barcelona Metro line 9, in Barcelona, Spain
 Stinson L-9, a 1940s American light utility monoplane
 Teamline Air, IATA code

See also
 9L (disambiguation)